This is a list of hospitals in Iraq derived from World Health Organization and other records.

Baghdad (The Capital)

Military Hospital
 Hammad Shahab Hospital
 Al-Rasheed Military Hospital
 Air Force Military Hospital
 Ibn Al-Kuff Military Hospital for Spinal Cord Injuries with Prosthetic Center/Factory

Private Hospitals
 Al Rahibat
 Al Rafidain
 Dar Al Najat
 Dar alshifa
 Baghdad
 Al Jarah
 Babel
 Qaisa
 Al Khaial
 Al Alusi
 Abdul Majeed
 Al Emam
 Dejla
 Al Razi
 Al Dhergham
 Al Jaibaji
 Al Zahraa
 Al Arabi
 Al Jami'a
 Dar Al Salam
 Al Rhma Hospital
 Al Mustansriya
 Al Amal
 Al Muaiyad
 Al Bisharah
 Al Furat
 Al Haidary Maternity
 Red Crescent
 Al Hayat Maternity
 Al Huda
 Al Harthiya
 Al Jadriya
 Surgery Red Crescent
 Al Wazirya
 Al Karada
 Al Sa'doon
 Al Salama Private
 Al Ferdaws
 Kamal Al Samerra'y
 Janin Private
 Risafa h
 Al Karch Hospital Group
 Z. Al Badri Dermatology and Cosmetics Clinic
 Al Shefaa Private
 Al Rawi
 Al Dahwi
 Al Mukhutar private hospital
 Al Khadria private hospital
alzayton private hospital

Basra

Public Hospitals 

 Teaching Hospitals
 Al Basrah General Teaching Hospital (Formerly, Al Jomhouri Hospital)
 Al Sadir Teaching Hospital (Formerly, Sadaam Hospital)
 Al Mawani General Teaching Hospital
 Al Basrah Maternity & Children's Teaching Hospital (Formerly, Ibn Gazwan Hospital)
 Al Fayhaa General Teaching

 General Hospitals
 Om Qasir General Hospital (Om Al Maarik)
 Al Zubair General Hospital
 Al Midaina General Hospital
 Al Qurna General Hospital (Saddamiya)
 Al Fao General Hospital 
 Abu Al-Khaseeb General Hospital
Private Hospitals
 Mossawi hospital
 Mowasat hospital
 Al Saadi Private Hospital
 Al Noor Private Hospital
 Ibn Al Baitar Private Hospital
 Dar Alshifaa Private Hospital
 Al Mawada Private Hospital

Dhi Qar 
Al-Hussein Teaching Hospital
Al-Refaai General Hospital
 Souq Al-Sheyoukh General Hospital
Al Shatera General Hospital
Al Chebaiesh General Hospital
Al Rabia Private Hospital
Al Amal Private Hospital
Al Habobi Specialized Hospital
Bint Al Huda Maternity & Children Hospital
Nasriyah Heart Center
Al-Rahman privet Hospital
Al-Nasiriyah General Hospital (under construction)
Mohammad AlMousawi Children Hospital

Anbar
The following hospitals are located in the Al Anbar Governorate.
 Hit/Heet General Hospital
 Al-Faluja General Hospital
 Anah General Hospital
 Rawah General Hospital
 Haditha General Hospital
 Al Rutba General Hospital
 Al Qa'im General Hospital
 Al Ubaidi
 Gynaecology, Obstetrics & Children
 Al-Faris Al-Arabi
 Saddam Teaching Hospital
 Al Mustafa Private Hospital
 Apollo Hospitals

Babil/Babel
The following hospitals are found in the Babil Governorate:
 Al Hilla Teaching Hospital
 Al Mahawil General Hospital
 Al Hashimiya General Hospital
 Al Musaib General Hospital
 AL Noor pediatric hospital 
 Al Alexsandriay General Hospital
 Al Faiha' Private Hospital
 Al Hayat Private Hospital
 Babil Private Hospital
 Babel Maternity & Children
 Eben Saif Al Jenabi (Maternity & Children)
 Merjan Medical City for Internal Medicine and Cardiology
 Imam Sadiq Educational/Teaching Hospital
 Thi Alkifil teaching hospital

Diyala
The following hospitals are in the Diyala Governorate:
 Ba'quba General Hospital, teaching hospital
 Al Muqdadiyah General Hospital
 Al Khales General Hospital
 Khaniqin General Hospitals
 Baladrus General Hospital
 Jalawlaa General Hospital (Al Shahid Muhamed Abdulah)
 Fevers Private Hospital
 Diyala Private Hospital
 Al Batool Maternity & Children Specialized Hospital  
 Al Zahra'a Maternity & Children Specialized Hospital
 Al Razi Infectious Diseases Specialized Hospital
 Al-Shefa private specialized hospital

Duhok
Rozana Hospital
Azadi Teaching Hospital (formerly Saddam Hussein Hospital, internal medicine)
"Baroshki" Emergency Teaching Hospital (trauma, surgery)
Hevi Pediatrics Teaching Hospital
Zakho General Hospital
Akre General Hospital
Amadiya Hospital
Duhok Burns and Plastic Surgery Hospital
Vin hospital and medical complex
Shilan Private Hospital
Duhok Private Hospital
Jiyan Private Hospital
 Par Hospital
German Private Hospital ( Duhok )
 Wan Global International Hospital

Erbil
 Erbil General Directorate of Health (DOH-Erbil) 
 Rapareen teaching Hospital for pediatrics, center (in Public sector)
 Maternity teaching Hospital, center (in Public sector)
 Rizgary teaching Hospital, center (in Public sector)
 West Emergency Hospital, center (in Public sector)
 East Emergency Hospital, center (in Public sector)
 Central Emergency Hospital, center (in Public sector)
 Nanakali Hospital for blood diseases and cancer, center (in Public sector)
 Hawler teaching Hospital, center (in Public sector)
 Hawler psychiatric teaching Hospital, center (in Public sector)
 Cardiac Center, center (in Public sector)
 Perman General Hospital, Permam district (in Public sector)
 Shaqlawa Hospital, Shaqlawa district (in Public sector)
 Shaheed Mulazim Kareem Hospital, Shaqlawa district, Salahaddin (in Public sector)
 Hareer Hospital, Shaqlawa district, Hareer (in Public sector)
 Soran general Hospital, Soran district, Diana (in Public sector)
 maternal and child Hospital, Soran district, Diana (in Public sector)
 Rawanduz Hospital, Soran district, Rawanduz (in Public sector)
 Choman Hospital, Choman (in Public sector)
 Mergasoor Hospital, Mergasoor district (in Public sector)
 Ble Hospital, Ble district, Barzan direc. (in Public sector)
 Zheen International Hospital (ZIH)
 ZANKO PRIVATE HOSPITAL
 CMC Private Hospital    
 Istanbul ENT and Aesthetic Center
 Swedish Specialist Hospital in Erbil
 Arbil Hospital, center
 Noor Medical Center and Hospital
Par Private Hospital
Shar Private Hospital

Kerbala/Karbala
The following hospitals are in the Kerbala Governorate:
 Al Hussain General Hospital, teaching hospital
 Ain Al Tamar General Hospital
 Al Hindiya General Hospital
 Specialized Pediatric Teaching Hospital
 Specialized Gynecology & Obstetric Teaching Hospital
 Private Alkafeel Super Specialized Hospital
 Zain Al Abdin Private Hospital
 Imam Al-Hujjah Hospital (private charity)
 Abbas Private Hospital
 Khatam Al Anbea'a Private Hospital (under construction in ?)
 Al Waeli Private Hospital (under construction in ?)

Kirkuk 
 Kirkuk General Hospital
 Azadi General Hospital
 General Hospitals Huzairan/for Ministry of Oil
 General Hospitals Al Hawija
 General Hospitals Al Wattan
 General Hospitals Al Taamem General
 General Hospitals Al-Daqoq
 Private Hospital Dar Al Hekmah Private
 Private Hospital Dar Al Salam Private
 Specialized Hospital Pediatric Hospital
 Kirkuk Military Hospital

Maysan 
 General Hospitals Al-Sadr General
 General Hospitals Ali Al Gharbi
 General Hospitals Qalaa Saleh
 General Hospitals Al Maimona
 General Hospitals Al Majar
 General Hospitals Al Humayyat (obsolete)
 Private Hospital Al Rahmah Private (obsolete)
 Specialized Hospital Al Zahrawi

Al Muthanna
 Al-Hussain teaching hospital 
 General Hospitals Al Rumatha
 General Hospitals Al Khedher
 Maternity & Children teaching Hospital

Al Najaf
 General Hospitals Al Sader General Teaching
 Najaf General Hospitals Al Najaf General
 Najaf General Hospitals Al Manathera
 General Hospitals Maternity & Children
 General Hospitals Al-Hussain
 General Hospitals Al-Kufa
 General Hospitals Al-Furat Al-Awsat
 Teaching Hospital Al Furat Middle Teaching
 Almanatherah general hospital

Ninawa
 General Hospital Talla'fer (Telafer General Hospital)
 General Hospital Sinjar
 Sinuni General Hospital
 General Hospital Al Shikhan
 General Hospital Al Hamdania
 General Hospital Tellafer
 Private Hospital Al Rabi' Private
 Private Hospital Al Rahmah Private
 Private Hospital Ninawa Private
 Private Hospital Al Zahrawi Private
 Specialized Hospital Al Batool for Gynaecology & Obstetrics
 Specialized Hospital Eben Al Athir for Children (Ibn Alatheer)
 Specialized Hospital Al Khansaa Maternity & Children
 Specialized Hospital Al Kamaliya (Specialized)
 Specialized Hospital Hazem Al Hafez (Oncology and Nuclear Medicine)
 Teaching Hospital Saddam General Teaching, now called Al-Salam Teaching Hospital.
 Teaching Hospital Eben Sina Teaching (Ibn Seena Teaching Hospital)
 Teaching Hospital Al Zahrawi for Surgery Teaching (Al-Jamhuri Teaching Hospital)
 Mosul Military Hospital, now called Mosul General Hospital.
 Al Shifaa Hospital for Infectious Diseases

Al Qadisiyyah
 General Hospitals Saddam General
 General Hospitals Al Shaheed Mahdi Tarrad
 General Hospitals Al Hamzah
 General Hospitals Al Shaheed Khalid Al Bider General Hospital
 General Hospitals Khalid Al-Bader
 General Hospitals Afek
 General Hospitals Al-Shamiya
 Private Hospital Al Diwaniah Private
 Private Hospital Al Shafaa Private
 Specialized Hospital Maternity and Children
 Specialized Hospital Fevers & Chest Diseases
 Specialized Hospital Infection Disease Hospital

Salah ad Din

Samarra
 General Hospitals Samerraa

Tikrit
 General Hospital Salahuddin
 Dijlah Rehabilitation Centre/Prosthetics
 Tikrit Teaching Hospital
 General Hospital Dijlah

Baiji
 General Hospitals Beji

Balad
 General Hospitals Baled

Al-Sherqat
 General Hospitals Al Sherqat

Touzkhermato
 Tuze of General Hospital

Sulaymaniyah
Governmental Hospitals:
 Sulaimanyah Teaching Hospital
 Sulaimanyah General Hospital
 Sulaimanyah Pediatric Hospital
 Sulaimanyah Gynecological and obstetric Hospital
 Shaheed Aso Eye Hospital
 Emergency Hospital
 Shorsh General Teaching Hospital
 Sulaimanyah Maternity Hospital
 Hewa Oncological Hospital
 Shar hospital (400 Bed)
 Kurdistan Gastrointestinal and hepatology center
 Sulaimanyah Cardiac catheterization center
 Sulaimanyah Cardiac surgery center
 Breast care center

Private Hospitals:

 Faruk Medical City
 Sulaimanyah private Hospital
 Ashty private Hospital
 Kurdistan Private Hospital
 Tooemaleek Private Hospital
 Hatwan Private Hospital
 Harem Private Hospital
 Azmir Private Hospital
 Soma Private Hospital
 Keo private Hospital
 Zhyan Private Hospital
Safin Private Hospital

Wasit 

 General Hospitals Al Zahraa(previously:Saddam)General
 General Hospitals Al Karama
 General Hospitals Al Nu'maniya
 General Hospitals Al Hay
 General Hospitals Al Suwaira
 General Hospitals Al Kut Cooperative
 General Hospitals Al Azizia
 Private Hospital Eben Sina Private
 Specialized Hospital Al Kut Surgery (Emergency)
 Specialized Hospital Al Zahaf Al Kabeer Maternity
 Specialized Hospital Haj Jalal

See also
Al-'Adudi Hospital (9811258)
List of cities in Iraq
List of neighborhoods and districts in Baghdad
Iraqi Ministry of Health

References

External links 
 War Takes Toll on Baghdad Psychiatric Hospital 
 Ministry of health
 Mental health in Iraq
 Kurdistan DOH
 Iraqi Medical Association
 U.S. Gives Iraqi Hospitals Broken Promises in Place of Medicine 
 Clean Environment for Al Sadr Teaching Hospital

 List
Iraq
Hospitals
Iraq